Adrian Nicholas Peterson (born July 1, 1979) is a former American football running back who played in the National Football League and United Football League. He was drafted by the Chicago Bears in the sixth round of the 2002 NFL Draft, playing eight seasons for Chicago. Then he played for the Virginia Destroyers in the UFL. He is an alumnus of Georgia Southern University, where he set numerous school, conference, and NCAA Division I-AA records, as well winning two 1-AA National Championships and receiving the Walter Payton Award for most outstanding player in 1-AA football.

Early years
Peterson was born to Porter R. and Reatha M. Peterson; his father works at a plant that makes Energizer batteries. Adrian Peterson was a two-time all-state, all-area selection and team MVP at Santa Fe High School in Alachua, Florida where he rushed for 4,949 yards during his prep career to earn All-America honors from ESPN and Blue Chip Illustrated. Peterson ran for 1,526 yards and 17 TDs on 185 carries (8.2 avg.) to earn Florida Class 4A Player-of-the-Year honors as a senior. He also lettered four times in track and two times each in weightlifting and basketball while in high school.

College career
Peterson played for Georgia Southern from 1998-2001. He finished his career, not including the playoffs, with 6,559 rushing yards, a Division I football record, and won the Walter Payton Award in 1999. He was the first sophomore to win the award for most outstanding player in I-AA football history. Peterson finished among the top three vote-getters for the Walter Payton Award in all four of his college football seasons. In 57 career games including the playoffs, he carried 1,378 times for 9,145 yards (6.6 avg), 111 touchdowns and an average of 160 yards per game.  On September 29, 2012, Peterson was inducted into the Georgia Southern hall of fame in a ceremony held during halftime at Paulson Stadium.  In January 2014, College Sporting News announced that the FCS Offensive Player of the Year Award will be named after Peterson. Peterson was inducted into the College Football Hall of Fame in 2017.

College statistics

Professional career

Chicago Bears
The Chicago Bears selected Peterson in the sixth round of the 2002 NFL Draft. During his first season as a Bear, he rushed for 101 yards on nineteen attempts, and scored a single touchdown.  He missed most of the next season after sustaining an ankle injury. The team has primarily relied on Peterson as a specialist. In 2004, he led the Bears' special teams unit with 28 tackles.

Peterson saw more action as a running back during the 2005 Chicago Bears season, after the Bears' top two running backs, Thomas Jones and Cedric Benson, suffered injuries.  On November 13, in the first game that both were injured, a game against the San Francisco 49ers, Peterson eclipsed the 100 yard mark in a game for the first time in his career.  He rushed for 120 yards on 24 attempts and scored a touchdown.  On the season, Peterson rushed for 391 yards on 76 attempts, and scored two touchdowns. Peterson was the team's second leading rusher during the season, and even went on to score a touchdown during the NFC Divisional game against the Carolina Panthers.

During the 2006 Chicago Bears season, Peterson returned to his role as a specialist and third string running back. He received occasional playtime as running back, but played a versatile role on the Bears' special teams. During the team's season finale, Peterson caught a 37-yard pass from Brad Maynard on a fake punt. In the NFC Championship game, Peterson tackled Michael Lewis and forced a fumble.

After the Bears traded Jones prior to the 2007 season, Peterson was promoted to second string running back. However, first string running back Cedric Benson sustained a season-ending injury on November 25, against the Denver Broncos. During the same game, Peterson scored his second rushing touchdown of the season, when he powered into the endzone despite being enveloped by several Bronco defenders. With this news, Peterson moved to first string, with rookie Garrett Wolfe moved to second string. Peterson had his second 100-yard rushing game on December 23, 2007, against the Green Bay Packers. Peterson had another productive performance the next week, during the Bears’ season finale against the New Orleans Saints. He rushed for 91 yards, and even threw a 9-yard touchdown pass to Bernard Berrian.

When the Bears drafted Matt Forte and brought in Kevin Jones, Peterson saw little to no action at running back. He was cut from the team after the Bears signed Chester Taylor before the 2010 season.

Peterson signed with the Seattle Seahawks on August 12, 2010, but was released by the team just five days later.

Virginia Destroyers
Peterson was drafted by the Virginia Destroyers in the third round (14th overall) of the 2011 UFL Draft. He signed with the team on June 15.

Georgia Southern University
On February 13, 2018, Peterson returned to Georgia Southern as director of student-athlete development for the football team under Chad Lunsford. He took over for Andrew Dodge, who moved to an on-field coaching assignment toward the end of the 2016 season.

Personal life
Peterson is the younger brother of former Atlanta Falcons linebacker Mike Peterson. He is also related to Freddie Solomon, who played for the Miami Dolphins and San Francisco 49ers. He performs community work and hosts an annual free youth football camp. Additionally, Peterson, who has a speech impediment, volunteers to help children who also face the same challenge.

Peterson released his autobiography Don't Dis My Abilities in 2013.

On February 17, 2015, Peterson's 7-year-old son died of brain cancer.

References

External links
 Adrian Peterson - at NFL.com

1979 births
Living people
Sportspeople from Gainesville, Florida
Players of American football from Gainesville, Florida
American football running backs
Georgia Southern Eagles football players
Chicago Bears players
Seattle Seahawks players
Walter Payton Award winners
Virginia Destroyers players
Georgia Southern Eagles football coaches